Joan Subirats Humet (born 1951) is a Spanish political scientist and professor at the Autonomous University of Barcelona. Since December 2021, he is minister of Universities of Spain.

He is a specialist in governance, public management and the analysis of public policy, and has also worked on social exclusion, democratic innovation and civil society. He was founding director of the Institute of Government and Public Policy (IGOP). He frequently writes for Spanish media, such as El País, Público, Eldiario.es and the Cadena SER. He was PhD advisor of researcher Mayo Fuster Morell. He was co-founder and spokesperson of the citizen platform Barcelona En Comú, currently governing the Barcelona municipality.

References

1951 births
Living people
People from Catalonia
Academic staff of the Autonomous University of Barcelona
Barcelona municipal councillors (2019–2023)

Government ministers of Spain